Kunratice is a municipal district (městská část) and cadastral area (katastrální území) in Prague. It is located in the southern part of the city. As of 2008, there were 8,089 inhabitants living in Kunratice.

The first written record of Kunratice is from the 13th century. The village became part of Prague in 1968.

In 1990, a bronze bust of T. G. Masaryk, the work of sculptor Vincenzo Makovský from 1935 (twice removed in 1940 and 1950) was restored in the central square of President Masaryk.

References

External links 
 Praha-Kunratice - Official homepage

Districts of Prague